Charaxes (Polyura) inopinatus is a butterfly in the family Nymphalidae. It was described by Julius Röber in 1939. It was original described from Celebes, probably erroneously, but the original specimen was lost.  In 2015 it was rediscovered in New Britain.

References

External links
Polyura Billberg, 1820 at Markku Savela's Lepidoptera and Some Other Life Forms

Polyura
Butterflies described in 1939